Limnothrix is a genus of cyanobacteria belonging to the family Pseudanabaenaceae.

Species

Species:

Limnothrix amphigranulata 
Limnothrix bicudoi 
Limnothrix borgertii

References

Synechococcales
Cyanobacteria genera